Khairi Chandanpur is a village development committee in Bardiya District in the Lumbini Province of south-western Nepal. At the time of the 1991 Nepal census it had a population of 5,303 and had 656 houses in the town.

References

Populated places in Bardiya District